Watkins Glen High School, also known as Watkins Glen Middle School, is a historic high school building located at Watkins Glen in Schuyler County, New York.  It  was built in 1929, and is a three-story, Classical Revival style brick school.  It has an "H"-plan and features a broad pedimented portico with full height Doric order columns.  A two-story addition was built in 1958. It was used as a high school until 1969, after which it housed a middle school. The school was closed in 2013, and is to be developed into senior housing, using the gymnasium and auditorium as community space.

It was listed on the National Register of Historic Places in 2015.

References

High schools in New York (state)
School buildings on the National Register of Historic Places in New York (state)
Neoclassical architecture in New York (state)
School buildings completed in 1929
Buildings and structures in Schuyler County, New York
National Register of Historic Places in Schuyler County, New York
1929 establishments in New York (state)